Loenpo Gang (also known as Lönpo Gang) is a mountain peak in the Himalayas on the border of Nepal and the Tibet Autonomous Region of People's Republic of China.

Location 
It is part of Jugal Himal range which also consists of following peaks Dorje Lhakpa and Phurbi Chyachu.

Climbing history 
The first ascent was made on May 3, 1962, by a Japanese team consisting of Tadashi Morita, and Kazunari Yasuhisa.

In 1988, a team of South Korean doctors from Chonnam National University Medical School climbed the peak from a new route. The team consisted of Ryong Yoon-Jae, Cho Suk-Phil, Kwon Hyeon, Hong Woon-Ki, Lee Jeong-Hoon, and Kim Soo-Hyeon.

References 

Mountains of the Himalayas
Mountains of Nepal
Six-thousanders of China